is the 23nd single of Japanese duo Pink Lady. Released by VAP on June 21, 1984, it marked the duo's comeback after their 1981 disbandment.

Track listing (7" vinyl) 
All arrangement by Makoto Matsushita.

References

External links
 
 

1984 singles
1984 songs
Pink Lady (band) songs
Japanese-language songs